Jade Linsey Johnson (born 7 June 1980, in London) is a retired English track and field athlete, specialising in long jump. She represented Great Britain at the Summer Olympics in 2004 and 2008. She placed fourth at the 2003 World Championships in Athletics and was a silver medallist at the 2002 Commonwealth Games.

She is allergic to sand. Jade's parents are from Liverpool, U.K., and Kingston, Jamaica.

Johnson came second in the 2002 Commonwealth Games. Later she won the silver medal at the 2002 European Championships and finished fourth at the 2003 World Championships. Her personal best is 6.81 metres, an Olympic qualifying distance, achieved in 2008 during the European Cup, where she placed second.

Jade just having returned from a serious injury, in November 2007 she had her lottery funding removed leading into Olympic year, making it harder for her to return to top rank competition. However, since then, she has set personal bests in the 100 metres and 200 metres sprints and in the long jump. She has also stated that she is now enjoying the sport more.

She came seventh in the final of the long jump in the 2008 Beijing Olympics, jumping 6.64 metres. She was very frustrated with her own performance and expressed a dissatisfaction that the winner the Brazilian Maurren Higa Maggi had previously tested positive for performance-enhancing drugs.

Johnson was selected to represent Great Britain at the 2009 European Indoor Championships but had to withdraw due to an injury.

On 25 August 2009, it was announced that she would compete in the 2009 series of Strictly Come Dancing on BBC1 with professional dancer Ian Waite. During final dress rehearsal for the 14 November edition of the show, Jade suffered a serious injury to her right knee, and therefore was forced to withdraw on 21 November. She stated that she was "devastated" to withdraw but had to be "realistic" and praised her dance partner Ian Waite for his support. Johnson returned with the other celebrities to perform at the final, and was given an extended time slot so she could perform the Tango that she had been due to perform before having to pull out.

References

External links
 Official website
 

1980 births
Living people
Athletes from London
British female long jumpers
English female long jumpers
Olympic female long jumpers
Olympic athletes of Great Britain
Athletes (track and field) at the 2004 Summer Olympics
Athletes (track and field) at the 2008 Summer Olympics
Commonwealth Games medallists in athletics
Commonwealth Games silver medallists for England
Athletes (track and field) at the 2002 Commonwealth Games
World Athletics Championships athletes for Great Britain
European Athletics Championships medalists
British Athletics Championships winners
Black British sportswomen
English people of Jamaican descent
Medallists at the 2002 Commonwealth Games